Ceratagra is a monotypic snout moth genus. Its only species, Ceratagra mitrophora, is found in Fiji. Both the genus and species were first described by Edward Meyrick in 1932.

References

Phycitinae
Monotypic moth genera
Moths of Fiji